IRFC may refer to:

 Indian Railway Finance Corporation, an Indian railway financing company
 Islamabad Rugby Football Club, a rugby football club from Islamabad, Pakistan